Chastain Memorial Park (originally known as the North Fulton Park, commonly known as Chastain Park) is the largest city park in Atlanta, Georgia.  It is a  park near the northern edge of the city.  Included in the park are jogging paths, playgrounds, tennis courts, a golf course, swimming pool, horse park and amphitheater.

Location
The wedge-shaped park is bounded on the east side by Lake Forrest Drive, on the west-southwest side by Powers Ferry Road and on the north-northwest end by West Wieuca Road. It is bisected in the middle by Nancy Creek, flowing from east to west.  It is surrounded by forested neighborhoods in the Buckhead area of the city, and is northwest of the original Buckhead Village and the uptown Lenox area.

Chastain Park is also a neighborhood on the west side of the park (across Powers Ferry Road to the west). The neighborhood is bordered by the city of Sandy Springs on the north, and by the Atlanta neighborhoods of Mount Paran/Northside on the west across Northside Drive and Tuxedo Park on the south. It is part of NPU A. The population was 2,398 as of 2010.

History
The land was originally home of Creek Indians, near the floodplain Nancy Creek. In 1840, the land was acquired by DeKalb County and used as a site for town hall meetings. In 1900, the land was sold to Fulton County with plans to build an almshouse for the poor. In 1909, the North Fulton Alm House opened. The housing was designed in a Neoclassical style by architectural firm Morgan and Dillon. At the start of the Great Depression, the Almshouse Cemetery was constructed.

In 1940, Fulton County proposed to construct a residential area on a large portion of the land. Both almshouses were planned to be demolished, although the cemetery would be left unharmed. Under the direction of Troy Green Chastain (Fulton County Commissioner) and with help from the Works Progress Administration, the North Fulton neighborhood was born. Out of the original 1,000 acres, 268 became "North Fulton Park". The park was composed of the North Fulton Golf Course, a clubhouse, Olympic-sized swimming pool, tennis courts, gymnasium, bathhouse, horse stables and polo field. The construction of the park was completed in 1945, a year after the death of Chastain. To honor his contribution of the park, the county renamed the park, the "Chastain Memorial Park" on September 25, 1946.

Features

Path
PATH Foundation began constructing a trail in Chastain Park in 1994, which has since expanded to a three-mile trail around Chastain Park and North Fulton Golf Course. PATH estimates an average of 250 people use the trail each hour, and is developing a second loop in the northern area of the park to meet demand.

Pool
A pool is also located within Chastain Park. It is a city pool, meaning it is open to the public most of the time, but nonmembers must pay to get in, and there are some times when only members can swim. The Chastain Park Athletic Club swim-team practices at this pool.

Chastain Park Amphitheater

References

External links
Chastain Park Civic Association

Parks in Atlanta